Alan Bermingham (born 11 September 1944) is an English former professional footballer who played as a full-back. He made over 100 appearances for Wrexham in the English Football League. He also played for Durban City in South Africa.
In 1967 he appeared for Skelmersdale Utd in the FA Amateur Cup Final against Enfield at Wembley Stadium. The score was 0–0 at full time and deep into extra-time Skelmersdale were awarded a penalty, which Bermingham struck against the post.
In the replay at Maine Road the following week Enfield won 3–0.

References

1944 births
Living people
English footballers
Association football defenders
Skelmersdale United F.C. players
Wrexham A.F.C. players
Durban City F.C. players
English Football League players
Footballers from Liverpool